Short-chain acyl-CoA dehydrogenase (butyryl-CoA dehydrogenase, butanoyl-CoA dehydrogenase, butyryl dehydrogenase, unsaturated acyl-CoA reductase, ethylene reductase, enoyl-coenzyme A reductase, unsaturated acyl coenzyme A reductase, butyryl coenzyme A dehydrogenase, short-chain acyl CoA dehydrogenase, short-chain acyl-coenzyme A dehydrogenase, 3-hydroxyacyl CoA reductase, butanoyl-CoA:(acceptor) 2,3-oxidoreductase, ACADS (gene).) is an enzyme with systematic name short-chain acyl-CoA:electron-transfer flavoprotein 2,3-oxidoreductase. This enzyme catalyses the following chemical reaction

 a short-chain acyl-CoA + electron-transfer flavoprotein  a short-chain trans-2,3-dehydroacyl-CoA + reduced electron-transfer flavoprotein

This enzyme contains FAD as prosthetic group.

See also
 Acyl-CoA dehydrogenase
 Medium-chain acyl-CoA dehydrogenase
 Butyryl-CoA (also known as butanoyl-CoA)

References

External links 
 

Flavoproteins
Enzymes of known structure
EC 1.3.8